Year zero is the year before 1 AD used in astronomical calculations.

Year Zero may also refer to:

Music 
 Year Zero (album), a 2007 album by Nine Inch Nails
 Year Zero (game), an alternate reality game based on the album
 Year Zero Remixed, a remix album by Nine Inch Nails
 "Year Zero" (song) by Ghost
 Year Zero, a 2004 album by Slam (band)
 Year Zero, a 1996 album by Buck 65
 Year Zero, a 2002 album by Galahad (band)
 Year Zero - the original soundtrack, a 2012 album by Black Mountain (band)
 "Year Zero", a song by Momus for his 2016 album Scobberlotchers
 "Year Zero", a song by Thirty Seconds to Mars

Literature 
Year Zero, a 2012 science fiction novel by Robert Reid (author)
Year Zero, a 1995 book of poetry by Brian Henderson (poet)
Year Zero, a 2002 novel by Jeff Long (writer)
Year Zero: A History of 1945, a 2013 nonfiction book by Ian Buruma

Entertainment 
Germany, Year Zero, a 1948 Italian film directed by Roberto Rossellini
Panic in Year Zero!, a 1962 American film directed by Ray Milland
Year Zero: The Silent Death of Cambodia, a 1979 British television documentary 
Tirana Year Zero, a 2002 Albanian film
 Year Zero (Bernice Summerfield), a Doctor Who audio drama
 "Year Zero" (Gotham), an episode of Gotham

Other uses
Year Zero (political notion), the dating of the takeover of Cambodia by the Khmer Rouge
Stunde Null, a reference to the first year in post-war Germany (1946)
The first portion of the Vault 7 documents made public by WikiLeaks in March 2017 are referred to as "Year Zero"

See also 
 Year One (disambiguation)